The Boucle du Coton was a cycling race held annually in Burkina Faso. It was part of UCI Africa Tour in category 2.2.

Winners

References

Cycle races in Burkina Faso
Recurring sporting events established in 2005
Recurring sporting events disestablished in 2011
UCI Africa Tour races
Defunct sports competitions in Burkina Faso
Defunct cycling races